Quill and Scroll is an international high school journalism honor society that recognizes and encourages both individual and group achievements in scholastic journalism. According to the Quill and Scroll website, over 14,104 high schools in all 50 U.S. states and 44 countries have established local chapters. The organization was founded on April 10, 1926, and is based out of the University of Iowa.

Joining
To be eligible for a charter, a high school must publish a magazine, newspaper, yearbook, literary magazine, broadcast program, or website; or, the school must have students who are under the supervision of a local news bureau, radio or television station, or publication. Charters are granted for the lifetime of the school's existence, and there are no dues.

When a charter is granted, the publication adviser or advisers automatically become a member. Only chartered schools may submit student names for nomination, as Quill and Scroll members and several activities are limited to chartered schools only. According to the Quill and Scroll membership form, the 2006–2007 one-time per student membership fee was $12.

To be eligible for induction into Quill and Scroll, students must meet the following five requirements:
They must be of junior or senior classification. Second semester sophomores may be initiated during the last grading period of their sophomore year. Their membership will become effective at the beginning of their junior year.
They must be in the upper third of their class in general scholastic standing, either for the year of their election or for the cumulative total of all high school work.
They must have done superior work in some phase of journalism or school publications work. They may be staffers of a magazine, newspaper, yearbook, news bureau or radio/television station.
They must be recommended by the supervisor or by the committee governing publications.
They must be approved by the Society's Executive Director.

Activities
Quill and Scroll have no requirements for local chapters' activities; each chapter is encouraged to engage in activities that best serve its school's journalism and publications program.

The society encourages student recognition through membership and by sponsoring the following activities:

International Writing, Photo Contest: Each school may submit four entries in each of 12 categories: editorial, editorial cartoon, news story, feature story, general columns, review columns, in-depth reporting (individual and team), sports story, advertisement, and photography (news-feature and sports).
Yearbook Excellence Contest: Each school may submit four entries in each of 11 categories: student life, academics, clubs, sports, people, advertising, sports action photo, academic photo, feature photo, graphics, and index.
News Media Evaluation: An in-depth critique of the school newspaper.

Magazine
All new members get a one-year subscription to Quill & Scroll Magazine, which contains articles, pictures, news items, hints for students and advisers, information about careers in journalism, and developments in the field of teaching journalism. The magazine is published four times during the school year.

External links

Official website

High school honor societies